Conophorus is a genus of bee flies in the family Bombyliidae. There are at least 16 described species in Conophorus in the United States, and 67 total worldwide.

Species
C. atratulus (Loew, 1872)
C. auratus Priddy, 1954
C. chinooki Priddy, 1954
C. collini Priddy, 1958
C. columbiensis Priddy, 1954
C. cristatus Painter, 1940
C. fallax (Greene, 1921)
C. fenestratus (Osten Sacken, 1877)
C. hiltoni Priddy, 1958
C. limbatus (Loew, 1869)
C. melanoceratus Bigot, 1892
C. nigripennis (Loew, 1872)
C. obesulus (Loew, 1872)
C. painteri Priddy, 1958
C. rufulus (Osten Sacken, 1877)
C. sackenii Johnson & Maughan, 1953
C. virescens Fabricius, 1789

References

External links

 Diptera.info
 NCBI Taxonomy Browser, Conophorus

Bombyliidae
Bombyliidae genera